Ramon Berenguer III or IV(c. 1158 – 5 April 1181), born Peter, was the count of Cerdanya (1162–1168) and count of Provence (1173–1181). 

He was the third son of Count Raymond Berengar IV of Barcelona and Queen Petronilla of Aragon. He received Cerdanya, including Carcassonne and Narbonne, on his father's death, but relinquished it to his younger brother Sancho in 1168. He never did govern his inherited territories. In 1173, his elder brother, Alfonso, granted him Provence. 

In 1176, he joined Sancho in conquering Nice from Genoa. He then ventured to war with the lords of Languedoc and the count of Toulouse. He was assassinated on 5 April 1181 by the men of Adhemar of Murviel near Montpellier. Provence passed to his brother Sancho.

References

Counts of Provence
1181 deaths
Aragonese infantes
Year of birth uncertain
Sons of monarchs